Glenmoore is an unincorporated community in Chester County, Pennsylvania, United States. It is notable for being the location of the Upattinas School and Resource Center (1971-2014).  The area is within the Philadelphia Metropolitan Area.  The historic village is within Wallace Township.  Glenmoore is located on Pennsylvania Route 282.  It was the birthplace of William Moore McClure, a Union Army colonel in the American Civil War.  According to DeLeon, Glenmoore is home of "... the smallest church in the world..." where the downtown is so small that it "... consists of an intersection with no traffic and one antiques shop next to a convenience store...."

References

Unincorporated communities in Chester County, Pennsylvania
Unincorporated communities in Pennsylvania